The Hopkinton Dolomite is a geologic formation in Iowa. It preserves fossils dating back to the Silurian period.

See also

 List of fossiliferous stratigraphic units in Iowa
 Paleontology in Iowa

References
 

Silurian Iowa